Hunter v Southam Inc [1984] 2 S.C.R. 145 is a landmark Supreme Court of Canada privacy rights case and as well is the first Supreme Court decision to consider section 8 of the Canadian Charter of Rights and Freedoms.

Background
An investigation was begun by the government under the authority of the Combines Investigation Act into Southam Newspaper. The investigators entered Southam's offices in Edmonton and elsewhere to examine documents. The search was authorized prior to the enactment of the Charter but the search did not commence until afterwards. The challenge was allowed.

At the Alberta Court of Appeal, the judge found that part of the Act was inconsistent with the Charter and therefore of no force or effect.

The Supreme Court considered section 8 for the first time and upheld the ruling of the Court of Appeal.

Reasons of the court
Justice Dickson (as he then was), writing for a unanimous Court, held that the Combines Investigation Act violated the Charter as it did not provide an appropriate standard for administering warrants.

The Court held that the purpose of section 8 is to protect an individual's reasonable expectation of privacy, and to limit government action that will encroach on that expectation. Furthermore, to assess the extent of those rights the right to privacy must be balanced against the government's duty to enforce the law.

In reaffirming the doctrine of purposive interpretation when reading the Constitution, Dickson goes on to make a fundamental and often quoted statement of the purpose of the Constitution and how it should be interpreted, stating:

External links
 

Section Eight Charter case law
Canadian Charter of Rights and Freedoms case law
Supreme Court of Canada cases
1984 in Canadian case law